Sujiatuo Area is an area and a town on the northwestern corner of Haidian District, Beijing, China. It shares border with Yangfang Town to the north, Shangzhuang and Xibeiwang Town to the east, Wenquan and Juanzhuang Towns to the south, Miaofengshan and Liucun Towns to the west. It had a population of 78,235 in the year 2020. 

During the Yuan dynasty this region was called Sujiakou Village, and the name was later changed to Sujiatuo for a lump of soil on the north of the village.

History

Administrative Divisions 
Sujiatuo Town was subdivided into 28 sections in 2021, including 9 communities, 10 villages and 9 residential areas for stock economic cooperatives:

Landmark 

 Dajue Temple

See also 

 List of township-level divisions of Beijing

References 

Haidian District
Towns in Beijing
Areas of Beijing